Gangsta 1 More Time is the seventh studio album and first mixtape by Mr. Serv-On, released in 2009.

Track listing

References

External links

2009 albums
Mr. Serv-On albums